Nitrosourea  is both the name of a molecule, and a class of compounds that include a nitroso (R-NO) group and a urea.

Examples
Examples include:
 Arabinopyranosyl-N-methyl-N-nitrosourea (Aranose)
 Carmustine (BCNU, BiCNU)
 Chlorozotocin
 Ethylnitrosourea (ENU)
 Fotemustine
 Lomustine (CCNU)
 Nimustine
 N-Nitroso-N-methylurea (NMU)
 Ranimustine (MCNU)
 Semustine
 Streptozocin (Streptozotocin)

Nitrosourea compounds are DNA alkylating agents and are often used in chemotherapy. They are lipophilic and thus can cross the blood–brain barrier, making them useful in the treatment of brain tumors such as glioblastoma multiforme.

Side effects 
Some nitrosoureas (e.g. lomustine) have been associated with the development of interstitial lung disease.

References

External links 
 
 

Nitrosamines
Ureas